When Everything Falls is Haste the Day's second full-length album. It was released on June 28, 2005 through Solid State Records. This was the last record to feature the band's original vocalist Jimmy Ryan until their 2015 release Coward.

By January 2006, the album had sold over 40,000 copies.

Track listing

Credits
Haste the Day
Jimmy Ryan- lead vocals
Brennan Chaulk - rhythm guitar, vocals
Jason Barnes - lead guitar
Michael Murphy - bass guitar, vocals
Devin Chaulk - drums, vocals
Additional musicians
 Francis Mark (From Autumn to Ashes) - Guest vocals on "For a Lifetime"

References

2005 albums
Albums produced by Garth Richardson
Haste the Day albums
Solid State Records albums